The Indigenous Nationalist Party of Twipra (abbr. INPT) was a political party in the Indian state of Tripura. Bijoy Kumar Hrangkhawl was the President of the party. It merged with the Tipraha Indigenous Progressive Alliance (TIPRA) party on 11 June 2021.

History
The INPT was formed as a merger of the Indigenous People's Front of Tripura and the Tripura Upajati Juba Samiti in 2002.

The formation of the INPT was pushed through after pressure from the underground National Liberation Front of Tripura, who wanted to unite all tribal nationalist forces in a single party. The INPT was commonly and wrongly perceived as the political wing of NLFT.

Prominent politicians

 Bijoy Kumar Hrangkhawl, former militant chief of Tripura National Volunteers
 Jagadish Debbarma, former Chairman of the TTAADC from 1990 to 1995
 Shyama Charan Tripura

Past results

TTAADC
As IPFT had a majority in the Tripura Tribal Areas Autonomous District Council, INPT came to govern that institution until 2003.

INPT suffered a serious setback in the summer of 2003, when a group of TTAAADC members under the leadership of Hiren Tripura broke away and formed the National Socialist Party of Tripura. One high-ranking INPT leader, Shyamcharan Tripura, took the side of the dissidents. NSPT were able to, with support from the Communist Party of India (Marxist) (CPI(M)) members in TTAADC, to win a majority in the assembly and INPT formed the opposition.

Tripura State Legislative Assembly
In the state assembly elections in 2003 INPT was allied with the Indian National Congress. INPT launched 18 candidates and Congress 42. Six INPT candidates were elected, and in total the party received 189 186 votes. The elections were won by the Left Front. After the 12th Assembly Election held in 2018, INPT has no representatives in the Tripura State Legislative Assembly.

Lok Sabha (parliamentary elections)
Ahead of the Lok Sabha elections in 2004 INPT joined the Bharatiya Janata Party (BJP)-led National Democratic Alliance. INPT supported the Nationalist Trinamool Congress and BJP candidates in the election.

See also
Tripuri nationalism
Tripura rebellion

References

External links
Constitution of INPT at Election Commission of India

Indian nationalist political parties
Political parties established in 2002
Political parties in Tripura
Tripuri nationalism
2002 establishments in Tripura
Indigenous People's Front of Tripura